The 1971 Montreal Expos season was the third season in the history of the franchise. The Expos finished in fifth place in the National League East with a record of 71–90, 25½ games behind the Pittsburgh Pirates.

Offseason
 December 30, 1970: Dave McDonald was traded by the Expos to the San Francisco Giants for Ron Hunt.
 January 1971: Jack Scalia was selected by the Expos third overall in the 1971 Major League Baseball draft. Scalia would never play a game for the Expos, as he suffered a back injury and pursued a modeling career.
 March 31, 1971: Don Hahn was traded by the Expos to the New York Mets for Rich Hacker and Ron Swoboda.
 March 31, 1971: Jim Qualls was traded by the Expos to the Cincinnati Reds Expos for Stan Swanson.

Spring training
The Expos held spring training at West Palm Beach Municipal Stadium in West Palm Beach, Florida, a facility they shared with the Atlanta Braves. It was their third season at the stadium.

Regular season

Season standings

Record vs. opponents

Opening Day starters
 Boots Day CF
 Ron Hunt 2B
 Rusty Staub RF
 Bob Bailey 3B
 Ron Fairly 1B
 Mack Jones LF
 John Bateman C
 Bobby Wine SS
 Carl Morton P

Notable transactions
 June 8, 1971: 1971 Major League Baseball draft
Future Canadian Football League star Condredge Holloway was drafted by Expos in the 1st round (4th pick).
Steve Rogers was drafted by the Expos in the 1st round (4th pick) of the Secondary Phase.
 June 15, 1971: Bob Reynolds was traded by the Expos to the St. Louis Cardinals for Mike Torrez.
 June 16, 1971: Jimy Williams was purchased from the Expos by the New York Mets.
 June 25, 1971: Ron Swoboda was traded by the Expos to the New York Yankees for Ron Woods.

Roster

Player stats

Batting

Starters by position
Note: Pos = Position; G = Games played; AB = At bats; H = Hits; Avg. = Batting average; HR = Home runs; RBI = Runs batted in

Other batters
Note: G = Games played; AB = At bats; H = Hits; Avg. = Batting average; HR = Home runs; RBI = Runs batted in

Pitching

Starting pitchers
Note: G = Games pitched; IP = Innings pitched; W = Wins; L = Losses; ERA = Earned run average; SO = Strikeouts

Other pitchers
Note: G = Games pitched; IP = Innings pitched; W = Wins; L = Losses; ERA = Earned run average; SO = Strikeouts

Relief pitchers
Note: G = Games pitched; W = Wins; L = Losses; SV = Saves; ERA = Earned run average; SO = Strikeouts

Award winners
1971 Major League Baseball All-Star Game

Farm system

Notes

References
 1971 Montreal Expos at Baseball Reference
 1971 Montreal Expos  at Baseball Almanac

Montreal Expos seasons
Montreal Expos season
1970s in Montreal
1971 in Quebec